Hose House No. 12, also known as Bassemier's Gas Grills, Inc., is a historic fire station located at Evansville, Indiana. It was designed by the architecture firm Harris & Shopbell and built in 1908.  It is a two-story, rectangular red brick building with an arched entranceway.  It features a campanile style tower with a saddleback roof that one housed the station's bells.

It was added to the National Register of Historic Places in 1982.

Gallery

References 

Fire stations on the National Register of Historic Places in Indiana
Government buildings completed in 1908
Buildings and structures in Evansville, Indiana
National Register of Historic Places in Evansville, Indiana
1908 establishments in Indiana